Schoonselhof Cemetery (Antwerpen Schoonselhof) is located in Hoboken, Antwerp, a suburb of Antwerp, Belgium.

Schoonselhof Cemetery has an islamic and Jewish section.

There is also a Commonwealth war graves plot containing the graves of 1,557 British Commonwealth service personnel who died in the World Wars, 101 from World War I and 1,455 from World War II, besides 16 Polish and 1 French war burial, a United States airman attached to the British Royal Air Force, and 16 non-war graves, mainly of merchant seamen.  The plot was laid out by Principal Architect of the Commonwealth War Graves Commission, Philip Hepworth.

The cemetery was mentioned in the TV show GRIMM, Episode 14 of Season 1.

Notable interments

References

External links
 
 
 "Schoonselhof Cemetery", Remembering the Fallen

Buildings and structures in Antwerp
Cemeteries in Belgium
Commonwealth War Graves Commission cemeteries in Belgium